The following is a list of rural municipality highways in the Canadian province of Saskatchewan between the numbers 700 and 799.

SK 700 

Steelman is the only community along the highway.

SK 701 

Highway 700 runs from Creelman at Highway 33 east to Highway 616 at the western end of the Moose Mountain Upland.

SK 702 

Highway 702 runs from Highway 39 / Highway 606 near Midale to Range Road 2054 near Browning. Highway 702 passes near Blewett, Bryant, Cullen, Minard, Luxton, and Lampman. Highway 702 also connects with Highways 47, 361, and 605.

SK 703 

Highway 703 runs from Highway 47 south of Estevan, east to Highway 604 north of North Portal.

SK 704 

Highway 704 runs from Highway 39 at Hitchcock east to Highway 605 north of Bienfait.

See also 
 List of Saskatchewan municipal roads (600–699)
 List of Saskatchewan provincial highways
 Roads in Saskatchewan

References 

Roads in Saskatchewan